Myrsine fernseei, the streambank colicwood, is a species of plant in the family Primulaceae. It is endemic to the Hawaiian Islands. It is threatened by habitat loss.

References

fernseei
Endemic flora of Hawaii
Trees of Hawaii
Near threatened biota of Oceania
Taxonomy articles created by Polbot